Tricondyla gounellei is a species of tiger beetle found in the forests of southern India and Sri Lanka. It hunts mainly on tree trunks.

References 

Beetles of Asia
Fauna of India
Fauna of Sri Lanka
Tricondyla
Beetles described in 1900